Michael Shane Campbell  (born 23 February 1969) is a New Zealand professional golfer who is best known for having won the 2005 U.S. Open and, at the time, the richest prize in golf, the £1,000,000 HSBC World Match Play Championship, in the same year. He played on the European Tour and the PGA Tour of Australasia.

Early life, amateur career 
Campbell was born in Hāwera, Taranaki. Ethnically, he is predominantly Māori, from the Ngāti Ruanui (father's side) and Ngā Rauru (mother's side) iwi. He also has some Scottish ancestry, being a great-great-great-grandson of John Logan Campbell, a Scottish emigrant to New Zealand. As a young child, he lived near his mother's Wai-o-Turi marae at Whenuakura, just south of Patea, and also spent much of his time with whanau at his father's Taiporohenui marae, near Hāwera.

Like many young New Zealand boys, Campbell dreamed of playing for the All Blacks, and began playing rugby union, but his mother vetoed his participation. While he was talented at several other sports, such as softball, squash and table tennis, his passion turned out to be golf.

At age of seven, he began playing golf on the Patea golf course which had the greens fenced to keep sheep off them. He was introduced to the game by an uncle, Roger Rei, but was also undoubtedly influenced by his father, Tom Campbell, who was a single-figure handicapper. The family moved south to Titahi Bay and Campbell developed his skills in junior ranks at Paraparaumu. He attended school at Mana College but left without any qualifications.

From 1988, Campbell represented New Zealand in various international amateur competitions, including the team victory at the 1992 Eisenhower Trophy, before turning professional in 1993.

Professional career 
In 1995, in his first full season on the European Tour, he held a two-shot lead after the third round of The Open Championship, but faded after a final-round 76. He nonetheless remained in contention until the final hole, missing a playoff with Costantino Rocca and John Daly (eventually won by Daly) by one stroke.

Campbell eventually established himself as a solid tour performer, finishing fourth on the European Tour Order of Merit (money list) in 2000, and again finishing in the top ten of the Order of Merit in 2002. He won the PGA Tour of Australasia's Order of Merit during the 1999/2000 season.

 

Campbell failed to make the cut in his first five 2005 tournaments. He made a quick turnaround and missed only one cut in the next 16 tournaments. He finished in the top six of both the Open Championship and PGA Championship, and recorded top-five placings in three other tournaments.

2005 U.S. Open 
Campbell qualified for the U.S. Open through sectional qualifying. The USGA introduced European qualifying for the first time, which took place at Walton Heath. He had to sink a 6-foot birdie putt on the last hole of qualifying to secure his place in the U.S. Open.

In the tournament itself, Campbell ended the third round four strokes behind Retief Goosen, the event's defending champion. On the final day, Goosen ballooned to an 81. Campbell shot 69 (1 under par) for the final round and was the only golfer in the last two pairings of the day to break 80. Campbell's main competition turned out to be Tiger Woods, who at one point closed to within one shot of Campbell.

In the end, Woods was undone by bogeys on the 16th and 17th holes, and Campbell won his first major by two shots, carding an even par of 280. With his win, he became only the second New Zealander to win a major (after Bob Charles), and also the first winner of the U.S. Open since Steve Jones in 1996 who had entered the event via sectional qualifying.

Two months later, in August, Campbell finished in a tie for 6th in the PGA Championship at Baltusrol, won by Phil Mickelson.

World Match Play champion 
In September 2005, Campbell won the HSBC World Match Play Championship at Wentworth. He defeated Australian Geoff Ogilvy (1-up) before being taken to the 37th hole by another Australian, Steve Elkington, in the quarter-final.

In the semi-final he faced Retief Goosen who the previous day had recorded a 12 and 11 win over Mark Hensby. Campbell defeated Goosen 7 and 6 and the next day beat Irishman Paul McGinley 2 and 1 in the final to take the championship and win the £1,000,000 richest prize in golf. He became only the fourth golfer to win the U.S. Open and the World Match Play titles in the same year, joining Gary Player, Hale Irwin and Ernie Els, and the win moved him to the top of the European Order of Merit, ahead of Goosen. He finished the year ranked second on the Order of Merit.

Later career, retirement and comeback 
Campbell had no top-10 finishes on the European Tour between 2009 and September 2012, although his U.S. Open win meant he retained his playing rights. In October 2012, he finished third in the Portugal Masters, and in December he finished 8th in the Hong Kong Open (both European tour events). He retired from golf in 2015, citing an ankle injury and personal issues.

In December 2017, Campbell revealed in an interview with bunkered magazine that he was planning to make a European Tour comeback in 2018 with a view to playing on the Staysure Tour and PGA Tour Champions when he turns 50 in February 2019. He is automatically qualified for the U.S. Senior Open from 2019 until 2028 as all former U.S. Open champions are exempt from qualifying for ten years. He was unable to play in the New Zealand Open as planned, having aggravated an old injury to a tendon in his left ankle during training.

Awards, honors and private life 
Campbell wife Julie and his sons Thomas and Jordan primarily reside in Sydney, Australia, which is Julie's hometown. In 2012 he moved first to Switzerland and then to southern Spain, where he opened a golf academy and has been the brand ambassador for a golf resort.

In the 2001 Queen's Birthday Honours, Campbell was appointed an Officer of the New Zealand Order of Merit, for services to golf.

On 29 October 2005, Campbell was awarded Honorary Life Membership of The European Tour for his U.S. Open win. In the 2006 New Year Honours, Campbell was appointed a Companion of the New Zealand Order of Merit, for services to golf.

Among his many New Zealand television appearances in 2008 was a cameo role in an episode of sports skit comedy show Pulp Sport.

Campbell is a co-founder of the Project Litefoot Trust, which is helping New Zealand community sports clubs reduce their environmental impact, while saving money for sport.

Amateur wins
1992 Australian Amateur, New South Wales Amateur

Professional wins (15)

PGA Tour wins (1)

European Tour wins (8) 

*Note: The 2000 Linde German Masters was shortened to 54 holes due to weather.
1Co-sanctioned by the PGA Tour of Australasia
2Co-sanctioned by the Asian Tour

European Tour playoff record (1–0)

Asian Tour wins (1)

1Co-sanctioned by the European Tour and the PGA Tour of Australasia

PGA Tour of Australasia wins (7)

1Co-sanctioned by the European Tour
2Co-sanctioned by the Asian Tour

PGA Tour of Australasia playoff record (1–0)

Challenge Tour wins (3)

Playoff record
Other playoff record (0–1)

Major championships

Wins (1)

Results timeline 

DQ = Disqualified
WD = Withdrew
CUT = missed the half-way cut
"T" indicates a tie for a place

Summary

Most consecutive cuts made – 5 (2004 Open Championship – 2005 PGA)
Longest streak of top-10s – 3 (2005 U.S. Open – 2005 PGA)

Results in The Players Championship

CUT = missed the halfway cut
WD = withdrew
DQ = disqualified
"T" indicates a tie for a place

Results in World Golf Championships

1Cancelled due to 9/11

QF, R16, R32, R64 = Round in which player lost in match play
"T" = tied
NT = No tournament

Team appearances 
Amateur
Nomura Cup (representing New Zealand): 1991
Eisenhower Trophy (representing New Zealand): 1992 (winners)
Sloan Morpeth Trophy (representing New Zealand): 1992 (winners)

Professional
Alfred Dunhill Cup (representing New Zealand): 1995, 1999, 2000
World Cup (representing New Zealand): 1995, 2001, 2002, 2003
Presidents Cup (International Team): 2000, 2005
Alfred Dunhill Challenge (representing Australasia): 1995

See also 
List of golfers with most European Tour wins

References

External links 

|-

New Zealand male golfers
PGA Tour of Australasia golfers
European Tour golfers
Winners of men's major golf championships
Companions of the New Zealand Order of Merit
New Zealand people of Scottish descent
New Zealand Māori sportspeople
People educated at Mana College
Sportspeople from Hāwera
People from Porirua
Ngā Rauru people
Ngāti Ruanui people
1969 births
Living people